The John Lewis Christmas advert is an ongoing television advertising campaign released by British department store chain John Lewis & Partners in the build-up to Christmas. John Lewis & Partners launched their first Christmas advert in 2007. It has since become something of an annual tradition in the UK, and one of the signals that the countdown to Christmas has begun. The adverts tend to attract widespread media coverage and acclaim upon their release. Between 2019 and 2020, the advert has promoted both John Lewis & Partners and Waitrose & Partners.

The songs used in the advertising campaigns are frequently covers (excluding 2018 and 2020) of existing songs by different artists. They have often reached high positions on the UK Singles Chart, and the original versions often receive a sales boost. Ellie Goulding, Gabrielle Aplin, Lily Allen, Aurora, Tom Odell and Vaults are among the artists whose music has appeared in a John Lewis Christmas advert. In 2018, Sir Elton John became the first artist to perform and star in the advert. In 2021, Lola Young was chosen to cover the 1980s hit "Together in Electric Dreams", with a slowed down arrangement which had alt-folk duo the Portraits accusing the retailer of copying them and their version of the song recorded in 2020.

London-based agency Adam & Eve/DDB have conceived the adverts since 2009. The adverts have led to some fierce competition, most notably from Sainsbury's, Marks & Spencer and Boots.

Campaigns

Official singles

1. Released before 2018 Christmas advert.
2. Released before 2022 Christmas advert.

Awards
John Lewis was honoured at the 2012 IPA Effectiveness Awards for their campaigns up to that point. They were awarded the top prize which is awarded to companies "showcasing and rewarding campaigns that demonstrate their marketing payback".

References

External links

John Lewis TV Advert Music

Advertising campaigns
British television commercials
Christmas in the United Kingdom
John Lewis Partnership